HAWK (formerly This or The Apocalypse) is an American metalcore band from Lancaster, Pennsylvania that formed in 2005.

History

Monuments (2005–2009) 
In 2008 the band signed to European metal label Lifeforce Records, and released the album Monuments later that year.  The band went on several tours throughout 2008 and 2009 with acts such as Kingston Falls, For Today, August Burns Red, A Skylit Drive, Sky Eats Airplane, and Greeley Estates across North America and Canada to promote Monuments.

Haunt What's Left (2009–2011) 
The band was featured on season 1 episode 4 of the MTV show Silent Library, which aired January 2010 with members Rick, Rodney, Jack, Sean and Grant.  On June 22, 2010, This or the Apocalypse announced their second studio album Haunt Whats's Left which was released on Good Fight/Road Runner Records.  The album was recorded by Josh Wilbur and produced by Chris Adler of Lamb of God at Spin Studios in New York. Following the release of the album bassist Sean and drummer Grant both left the band for other projects. Sean left to focus on his band Bells with former August Burns Red vocalist Jon Hershey. Grant embarked on a career in music production and mastering, and joined the band Century which also features This or the Apocalypse vocalist Ricky on bass. This or the Apocalypse toured throughout 2010 to support Haunt What's Left with bands such as Impending Doom, and MyChildren MyBride, and headlined a tour with Affiance, Last Chance to Reason and Deception of a Ghost.

Dead Years (2011–2018) 
In June 2012, the band signed with eOne and released Dead Years on September 25, 2012. In 2013, the band released a new single titled "Damaged Good".

Name change to HAWK and upcoming album (2018-present) 

In 2018 the band was renamed to HAWK and on March 22, 2019, released a new song titled "Mileage". Since then they have also self-released 2 more videos, "Counter-Ops" and "Alibi".

On December 4, 2020, HAWK released their first LP titled "Tolerance's Paradox" which included the previous 3 singles and 3 yet unreleased tracks.

Musical style and influences 
This or the Apocalypse fall into the metalcore genre. Their music is characterized primarily by a heavy emphasis on melody and technical ability.  The band's music features frequent use of technical or odd time signatures, complex polyrhythms, and some songs have been described as having a prog-rock structure.

Members 

Current
 Ricky Armellino − lead vocals (2005–present)
 Jack Esbenshade − lead guitar (2005–present)
 Adam Reed − drums (2018-present)
 Bernie Stabley – bass, backing vocals (2018-present)

Former
 Robert Rivera Jr. – bass guitar (2005–2006)
 Toby Pool – drums (2005–2006)
 Jacob Belcher – rhythm guitar (2005–2007)
 Kevin Bakey – bass guitar (2006–2007)
 Sean Hennessey − bass guitar (2007–2010)
 Grant McFarland − drums (2006–2010)
 Brent Caltagirone – drums (2010–2011)
 Matthew Marcellus − bass, backing vocals (2010–2013)
 Aaron Ovecka − drums (2011–2013) (currently in Breather)
 Aaron Maloney − drums (2013–2014)
 Rodney Phillips − rhythm guitar, backing vocals (2007–2014)

Timeline

Discography 
as This or the Apocalypse:
Studio albums
 Sentinels (Self-released, 2006)
 Monuments (Lifeforce Records, 2008)
 Haunt What's Left (Good Fight Entertainment, 2010)
 Dead Years (eOne, 2012)

Extended plays
 Drunken Billionaire Burns Down Home (Self-released, 2006)

as HAWK:
Extended plays
 Tolerance's Paradox (Self-released, 2020)

References

External links 
This or the Apocalypse on Lifeforce Records
This or the Apocalypse on Good Fight Records
This or the Apocalypse official Facebook

Heavy metal musical groups from Pennsylvania
Metalcore musical groups from Pennsylvania
Musical groups established in 2005
Musicians from Lancaster, Pennsylvania